Robert Ivry is an American financial journalist, and staff reporter for Bloomberg News.

He worked for the San Francisco Bay Guardian, San Francisco Examiner, Bergen Record, of Hackensack, New Jersey.
His work appeared in Esquire, Washington Post Book World, Popular Science, Maxim, Spin, Details, Self, and Ploughshares.

Awards
2014 Gerald Loeb Award for New Services for "Rigging the World's Biggest Market"
2010 Hillman Prize
2009 George Polk Award
2008 Gerald Loeb Award for News Services for "Wall Street's Faustian Bargain"

Works
"He made rock criticism into an art form", Bergen Record, June 8, 2000

References

External links

American male journalists
Living people
George Polk Award recipients
Year of birth missing (living people)
Gerald Loeb Award winners for News Service, Online, and Blogging